Moneta is an unincorporated community in O'Brien County, Iowa, United States.

History
Moneta was platted in 1901. The name Moneta is supposed to be a poetic form for the island of Anglesey.

Moneta's population was 87 in 1915.

References

Populated places in O'Brien County, Iowa
Unincorporated communities in Iowa
Populated places established in 1901
1901 establishments in Iowa